Michael Anthony Knight Jr. (April 11, 1978 – October 17, 2017) was an American fashion designer.

Biography
Michael Anthony Knight Jr. was born on April 11, 1978 in Nuremberg, Germany to Pamela and Michael Anthony Knight Sr.

Although Knight spent his childhood in Montgomery, Alabama, in 1996 he received his high school diploma from Washingtonville Senior High School in Washingtonville, New York. Later that same year, Knight began his freshman year of college at Georgia Southern University in Statesboro, Georgia. In 2001, this university awarded Knight a Bachelor of Science degree in Apparel Design and Merchandising.

After completing his undergraduate studies, Knight broke into the fashion industry in Atlanta, Georgia by working as an intern at Wilbourn Exclusives in 2001 and then by becoming a fashion stylist in the music industry in 2002.

In 2005, Knight auditioned for the second season of the Bravo network reality television series, Project Runway, but he was not accepted as a season two contestant. In 2006, Knight reauditioned for Project Runway, and this time he was accepted as a contestant for season three. Knight went on to win season three's Fan Favorite award and to place fourth in the overall competition.

In 2007, Knight introduced his label, Mychael Knight, on BET's Rip the Runway  and he designed a line of custom tees for the Starbucks Corporation.

In 2008, Knight launched Kitty & Dick, his female and male lingerie label, and his unisex fragrance, MajK.

On August 20, 2009, the Project Runway: All Star Challenge aired  on Lifetime Television. Knight joined Daniel Vosovic and Santino Rice of season two, Jeffrey Sebelia and Uli Herzner of season three, Chris March and Sweet P of season four, and Korto Momolu of season five in a special, "one-shot" competition where the winner, Vosovic, received $100,000.

On March 17, 2010, Mychael Knight debuted his Fall/Winter 2010 line at Charleston Fashion Week in Charleston, South Carolina.

In 2013, Knight became a contestant on Project Runway: All Stars (season 3).

Mychael Knight died on October 17, 2017 at the age of 39. His cause of death remains a mystery. He had been open about his battle with irritable bowel syndrome and extreme weight loss in recent months, leaving many to wonder if the disease may have played a role in his death. Doctors believe that unlikely, however.

References

External links
 Official Website
 Mychael Knight on MySpace
 Fall/Winter 2010 Debut at Charleston Fashion Week

1978 births
2017 deaths
African-American fashion designers
American fashion designers
Artists from Atlanta
People from Montgomery, Alabama
Project Runway (American series) participants
Georgia Southern University alumni
20th-century African-American people
21st-century African-American people

pt:Michael Knight